The ash whitefly (Siphoninus phillyreae) is a species of whitefly native to western Eurasia, India and North Africa but also introduced to North America. It is known in agriculture as a pest species of fruit trees, including pomegranates, pear and apple trees. It also feeds on ash and ornamental pear trees. Encarsia inaron is used as a biological control for it.

References

External links
 Invasive Species Compendium

Whiteflies
Agricultural pest insects
Insects described in 1835